The Patagonia picnic table effect (also known as the Patagonia rest area effect or Patagonia rest stop effect) is a phenomenon associated with birding in which an influx of birdwatchers following the discovery of a rare bird at a location results in the discovery of further rare birds at that location, and so on, with the end result being that the locality becomes well known for rare birds, even though in itself it may be little or no better than other similar localities. This is due to an increase in attendance leading to increased potential for rare birds to be viewed there.

The name arises from the Arizona State Route 82 rest stop and picnic table south of Patagonia, where the phenomenon was first noted. As of August 2022, 229 species have been recorded there.

Research from Oregon State University suggests that the phenomenon may be a myth; no significant difference was found between a period surrounding rare-bird events at a site and a baseline in the findings of rare birds. As well, it suggests that much of the draw is due to increased use of online sources such as eBird. Despite the study's suggestions that the effect may be a myth, the authors narrowly defined "rare birds" as ABA code 3 birds or above, despite these occurrences providing an incomplete sample of rare birds, as many species that are common in one part of the ABA may be rare in another region of this large geographic location.  Additionally, the Patagonia picnic table effect does not suggest that a rare bird being found at a location will result in more rare birds being found at that location, but rather that increased coverage of a birding location increases the probability of common and rare birds being found alike, and that when a rare bird is found it will increase the amount of birders going to that location. As a result, this coverage increases the probability more rare birds will be found.

See also
 Selection bias
 Wisdom of the crowd

References

Birdwatching